Humppa-Akatemia is a 2000 compilation album by the Finnish group Eläkeläiset.

Track listing

Disc 1
 Hyljätyn humppa (Hanoi Rocks – Don't You Ever Leave Me)
 Humppasonni (HIM – Join Me)
 Humppaosasto (Jalla Jalla – Hospital Waltz)
 Ja humppa soi (Rauli Badding Somerjoki – Ja rokki soi)
 Humppapappa vaan (Ebba Grön – Mamma, Pappa, Barn)
 Humppa sujuu (Weeping Willows – True To You)
 Hump (Van Halen – Jump)
 Kuusessa hevon (Eric Clapton – Tears In Heaven)
 Humppamedia (Kent – Om du var här)
 Hotelli helpotus (The Eagles – Hotel California)
 Paratiisihumppa (Stevie Wonder – Pastime Paradise)
 Humppaa, saatanat (Spencer Davis Group – Gimme Some Lovin')
 Poltettu humppa (Midnight Oil – Beds Are Burning)
 Humppakonehumppa (Meredith Brooks – Bitch)
 Humpparaakki (Dio – Holy Diver)
 Humppalialaiset (Peter Gabriel – Games Without Frontiers)
 Pultsarihumppa (Weezer – Buddy Holly)
 Humppakostajat (Suede – The Beautiful Ones)
 Humppaleski 45 (Police – Every Breath You Take)
 Miinakenttähumppa (X-Perience – Magic Fields)
 Humppasusi Ruotsissa (Frank Zappa – Bobby Brown)
 Humpaten ympäri maailman (John Fogerty – Rocking All Over The World)
 Humppamaratooni (Whiskey In The Jar)

Disc 2
 Humppapommi (Rancid – Time Bomb)
 Humppa (Cranberries – Zombie)
 Dumpkopf (Troggs – Wild Thing)
 Humppaa tai kuole (2 Unlimited – No Limits)
 Savua Laatokalla (Deep Purple – Smoke On The Water)
 Laakista humppa (Damned – Love Song)
 Eläkeläiset (Spin Doctors – Two Princes)
 Elän humpalla (Bon Jovi – Living On A Prayer)
 Humppaan itsekseni (Billy Idol – Dancing With Myself)
 Sortohumppa (J.M.K.E. – Tere Perestroika)
 Sorvarin humppa (Motörhead – Ace Of Spades)
 Pyjamahumppa (Roxette – Sleeping In My Car)
 Ryhtivaliohumppa (ZZ Top – Sharp Dressed Man)
 Kuka humpan seisauttaa? (Creedence Clearwater Revival – Who'll Stop The Rain)
 Aamupalahumppa (Suzanne Vega – Tom's Diner)
 Humppaleka (Elvis Presley – Viva Las Vegas)
 Pöpi (22-Pistepirkko – Birdy)
 Heil humppa (Kim Wilde – Kids In America)
 Kahvipakettihumppa (Neil Young – Rocking In The Free World)
 Dementikon keppihumppa (Kiss – I Was Made For Loving You)
 Humppalaki (Judas Priest – Breaking The Law)
 Kiping kapin, mä riennän alkoon (Led Zeppelin – Living Loving Maid)
 Humppaukaasi (Queen – We Will Rock You)
 Jääkärihumppa (Europe – Final Countdown)
 Poro (Kraftwerk – Robots)
 Astuva humppa (Nancy Sinatra – These Boots Are Made For Walking)
 Lumpiohumppa (The Who – My Generation)

Also two 'hidden' tracks: Poterohumppa (Cyndi Lauper – She Bop) and En saa millään humpatuksi (Rolling Stones – I Can't Get No Satisfaction)

References 
 The official home page of Eläkeläiset
Russian Eläkeläiset fanclub
Texts from this album

2000 compilation albums
Eläkeläiset albums